Östra skolan (East School) is a school in Hudiksvall, Sweden. It is a Swedish 7-9 school, and educates pupils between the ages of 12–16 years old. The school was built and founded ca 1908. It is commonly known as "Öster" (Eastern) in Hudiksvall.

External links
Website

Gävleborg County